= Ketavik Formation =

Geologic formation in Alaska, United States

- Stratigraphic range: Paleogene
- Type: Formation

Location
- Region: Alaska
- Country: United States

The Ketavik Formation is a lithostratigraphic formation of Palaeogene age in southwestern Alaska. It is known for preserving fossilised dicots, coniferous leaves, and wood.
